Operation Neer (Hindi: "Water") was initiated by Indian government in response to the Maldivian government's request for help after major fire broke out at the  (MWSC) generator control panel on 4 December 2014, causing extensive damage to the cabling of the generator to the Distillation plants and disconnection of water supply. The Maldives do not have standing fresh water, and is thus entirely dependent on desalination plants.

Indian response
The Indian Navy diverted , which was off the coast of Kochi, to Malé, the capital of the Maldives. She carried 35 tonnes of fresh water and has the capability to produce 20 tonnes of water every day.
On 7 December, the  a large fleet tanker reached Male carrying 1000 tonnes of water.
The Indian Air Force also provided five aircraft including two C-17 Globemaster-III and three IL-76 with 153 tonnes of water on 5 December, and again on the 6th of December, provided three aircraft with 130 tonnes on 6 December. One C-17 aircraft with 40 tonnes and another aircraft with about 40 tonnes have also reached Male on 7 December.

International cooperation
After an appeal for aid from India, Sri Lanka, the United States, and China responded with aid programs of their own; 

References

Indian Air Force
Humanitarian military operations
Non-combat military operations involving India
Airlifts
Modi administration
India–Maldives relations
2014 in India